Viktor Vladimirovich Sheiman (born 26 May 1958) is a Belarusian politician.

Sheiman has been a close ally of Belarusian dictator Alexander Lukashenko since Lukashenko came to power in 1994. Sheiman was Belarus’ prosecutor general in 2004. Sheiman has been sanctioned by both the European Union and the United States over the disappearances of Lukashenko's critics.

The Pandora Papers leaks revealed that Sheiman and his family secretly owned an offshore company that was active in dealings with Zimbabwe's state-owned mining company at the same time that Sheiman was negotiating trade agreements between Belarus and Zimbabwe on behalf of the Belarusian government.

Political life
He graduated from the Blagoveshchenskoe Tank Command Red Banner School in Gorky Oblast and the Ministry of the Interior Academy of the Republic of Belarus in Minsk. He served in the Soviet Airborne Troops, and participated in the Soviet–Afghan War, eventually attaining the rank of Major General. In 1990, he was elected Deputy to the Supreme Soviet of the Byelorussian SSR for the Brest constituency, a post he held until 1994. He was also Secretary of the Commission of the Supreme Soviet for Questions of National Security, Defence and Crime Control. He has been an active supporter of Alexander Lukashenko since his election in 1994. On 5 August 1994, the day the Security Council of Belarus was created by presidential decree, he was appointed Secretary of the Security Council of Belarus.

On 10 August 1994, he was made a member of the Board of the Belarusian Ministry of Defense. On 12 August 1994, he was made a member of the Ministry of Internal Affairs. From 16 December 1995 to 27 November 2000, he held the posts of Secretary of the Security Council of Belarus and Minister of Internal Affairs. On 27 November 2000, he was dismissed from the post of Secretary of the Security Council and made Assistant to the President for National Security. From 28 November 2000 to 29 November 2004, he was Prosecutor General of Belarus.

From 29 November 2004 to 4 January 2006, he was Head of the Administration of the President of Belarus.

On March 20, 2006, he was again appointed Secretary of the Security Council of Belarus.

On 21 April 2007, he was appointed Cochairman of the Belarusian-Venezuelan Joint Commission.

In January 2009, the Press Secretary of the Security Council of Belarus stated that Viktor Sheiman was appointed Assistant to the President for Special Commissions.

Later, Sheiman was again made subject of an EU travel ban and asset freeze, following the crackdown of opposition protests after the 2010 presidential election in Belarus.

In its decision, the EU Council accused Sheiman of being "responsible for the unresolved disappearances of Yuri Zakharenko, Viktor Gonchar, Anatoly Krasovski and Dmitri Zavadski in Belarus in 1999–2000. Former Secretary of the Security Council. Sheiman remains a Special Assistant/Aid to the President."

According to the Pandora Papers, Viktor Sheiman's son Sergei Sheiman owned 50% of offshore company "Midlands Goldfields Foundation" (established in 2017) with Belarusian-American businessman  owning another 50%. This company (via British "Midlands Goldfields Limited") owned 70% of "Zim GoldFields Limited" which operated gold exploration and mining projects in Zimbabwe. Viktor Sheiman visited Zimbabwe at least twice and later reported about the big mining deal with this country. According to the Organized Crime and Corruption Reporting Project, Viktor Sheiman and Aleksandr Zingman visited Zimbabwe together. Political scientist Vytis Jurkonis characterized the offshore scheme with a company of Zingman and Sheiman's son as an example of nepotism and conflict of interest. Journalist Stas Ivashkevich suggested that the business of Sergei Sheiman was created to make a profit from the deals made by Viktor Sheiman on behalf of the Belarusian government.

Ranks and titles
 On 6 December 1996 – Major General
 On 28 November 2000 – State Adviser of Justice, II class
 On 25 November 2004 – State Adviser of Justice, I class
 On 29 November 2004 – Higher Class of the Employee of Government Apparatus

Awards
 Order of Merit for the Fatherland, II degree (2003)
 Order of Merit for the Fatherland (1998)
 Order of the Red Banner of Labour
 Order of the Red Star
 Medal For Courage

Criticism
Viktor Sheiman has been criticized for using his position as Prosecutor General to close down by its action Court decision closed the main oppositional newspaper Svaboda. Political opposition groups and international human rights organizations accuse Sheiman of organizing "death squads" responsible for killing members of organized criminal groups, opposition politicians and Russian Channel One cameraman Dzmitry Zavadski. In 2006, he was placed on a list of over 40 members of the Belarusian government banned from entering the European Union and the United States for allegedly participating in the manipulation of the results of the presidential election; the ban was lifted in 2008.

In 2018, Viktor Sheiman was under sanctions under the US and the EU. The United States extended the sanctions until June 2019, believing that Viktor Sheiman became a barrier to democratic processes in Belarus. In February 2018, the EU extended the sanctions on Viktor Sheiman for a year. This provided for a ban on entry into the EU and blocking bank accounts.

Personal life
Viktor Sheiman is married, and has a son and a daughter.

References

External links

1958 births
Living people
People from Voranava District
Government ministers of Belarus
Belarusian individuals subject to the U.S. Department of the Treasury sanctions
Specially Designated Nationals and Blocked Persons List